East Side Blues is an album by pianist John Hicks's Trio recorded in Japan in 1988 and released on the Japanese DIW label.

Reception
The Allmusic review stated "This album is explosive and substantive".

Track listing
All compositions by John Hicks except where noted.
 "East Side Blues" - 7:10  
 "Yemenja" - 6:03
 "Never Let Me Go" (Jay Livingston, Ray Evans) - 7:18
 "Out of Somewhere" - 6:44    
 "Mou's Move" - 7:15     
 "Is That So?" - 8:01 
 "Somedity - 4:32
 "A Beautiful Friendship" - 6:40

Personnel
John Hicks - piano
Curtis Lundy - bass
Victor Lewis  - drums

References

John Hicks (jazz pianist) albums
1988 albums
DIW Records albums